Perfluorobutanoic acid (PFBA) is a perfluoroalkyl carboxylic acid with the formula C3F7CO2H.  As the perfluorinated derivative of butyric acid, this colourless liquid is prepared by electrofluorination of the corresponding butyryl fluoride.

Applications  
PFBA has a variety of niche applications in analytical and synthetic chemistry.  It is an ion pair reagent for reverse-phase HPLC.  It is used in the sequencing, synthesis, and solubilizing of proteins and peptides.

Esters derived from PFBA readily undergo condensation, owing to their electrophilicity.  Specialized ligands for metal ions are generated capitalizing on this property, such as Eufod.

References 

Perfluorocarboxylic acids